Torrent is a city located within the metropolitan area of the city of Valencia, Spain. It is the largest municipality of the Horta Oest comarca, with 83,962 inhabitants (2020). It is situated some 7 km from Valencia city proper, to which it is connected via the metro. The two metro stations in Torrent are called Torrent and Torrent Avinguda on lines 1, 2 and 7.

It is bordered by Aldaia, Alaquàs and Xirivella in the north, Picanya and Catarroja in the east, Alcàsser and Picassent in the south and Montserrat, Godelleta, Turís and Xiva in the West. All of the cities are part of the province of Valencia.

Geography 
There are only a few remarkable mountains in the municipal territory: El Vedat (142 m), Morredondo (157 m), Barret (142 m), Cabeçol de l'Aranya (228 m) and the Serra Perenxisa (329 AMSL). About a 20% of the territory is mountainous. Torrent  is crossed by a gully (Barranc de Torrent) which flows into the Albufera lagoon and estuary.

History 
The village of Torrent was officially founded by people of European ancestry in 1248, after the Reconquista although the tower and its fortification were built several centuries earlier. Archaeological research suggests that there were inhabitants in the zone in the Bronze Age.

It was originally a fief of the Knights Hospitaller.

Main sights

The Medieval Tower

The Medieval Tower was built by the Moors and was part of an ancient castle. It was double-walled and had some underground passages.

The tower, which lies in a square, has a truncated pyramid shape and is 30 metres high, with 5 floors and a terrace where The Cross of the St. John of Jerusalem order and a Valencian "rat penat" can be seen at the four upper corners. 
Access to the tower is through an exterior staircase connecting to a door at the first floor.
Around 1613 porticoes were built around to house a market around the tower. In 1847 it became the property of Torrent.

The tower has often been used as a prison throughout its history, and the porches have hosted the Courts in its upper floors since 1908 (when new ones were built). The porticoes were demolished in 1970. After its restoration, the Tower houses two exhibition halls.

Sant Lluís Bertrán's Hermitage
The shrine dedicated to Saint Lluís Bertrán is a traditional and beloved church by all people in Torrent, since Sant Blai among other festivities are held in the hermitage. In 1634 the City Council agreed to build the chapel dedicated to Saint Lluís Bertran. After many changes and reconstructions it was used for military purposes during the Spanish civil war and was finally restored after that conflict.

Internally, it consists of a nave and two sides. The neoclassical facade is divided into three parts. The door has an arc with archivolt, St. Louis' image and a large rosette appear over the door. The bell tower has a hexagonal base and was finished in 1829. It has four bells and a clock with three spheres, installed there in 1950.

Església de l'Assumpció

The parish church of Nostra Senyora de l'Assumpció was built in the 13th century, in the same place as the current one, but much smaller. Its rector attended the diocesan synods in the fourteenth century. An image of the "Verge del Pòpul", which disappeared in 1936, was likely the main image in the ancient parish. It has had many fires and thefts with the result that the church that exists nowadays has had many restorations and modifications.

Local politics
Until 2007, the mayor was supplied by the Spanish Socialist Workers' Party (PSOE) who controlled the local council either alone or with the support of smaller left wing parties. The People's Party had majority control of the council from 2007 to 2015. Since 2015, the mayor has been Juan Jesús Ros Piles of the PSOE, who have governed in a minority administration with the support of Coalició Compromís.

Summary of council election results

Source:

Twin towns
 Benalup-Casas Viejas, Spain
 Gharb, Malta
 Zebbug, Malta

Notable people 
 Paco Alcácer, footballer
 Vicente Guaita, footballer
 Pedro López Muñoz, footballer
 Roger Martí, footballer

Notes

References

External links 

  
 Federació Esportiva Municipal de Torrent, Local Sports Federation

Municipalities in the Province of Valencia
Horta Oest
1248 establishments in Europe
13th-century establishments in Aragon